António Guedes de Herédia (10 March 1901 – 13 August 1997) was a sailor from Portugal, who represented his country at the 1928 Summer Olympics, 1936 Summer Olympics and the 1948 Summer Olympics.

References

Sources
 

Sailors at the 1928 Summer Olympics – 6 Metre
Sailors at the 1936 Summer Olympics – Star
Sailors at the 1948 Summer Olympics – Dragon
Olympic sailors of Portugal
1901 births
1997 deaths
Sportspeople from Lisbon
Portuguese male sailors (sport)